Mount Starr King is a symmetrical granite dome in Yosemite National Park, whose highest point is  above sea level.

Climbing Starr King's dome requires technical skills or equipment, and the easiest routes are rated low class 5 in the Yosemite Decimal System.

It was named for Thomas Starr King, a Unitarian preacher and political activist. It has historically been known by various names including Kings Peak, See-wah-lam, South Dome, and Tis-sa-ack.

See also
 Mount Starr King, a New Hampshire mountain named for Starr King

References

External links
 

Granite domes of Yosemite National Park
Mountains of Mariposa County, California
Hills of California